Coleostephus myconis, known as the corn marigold, is an annual herbaceous plant belonging to the genus Coleostephus of the family Asteraceae.

Description
It is glabrous to hairy, the stem is erect, usually branched. The lower leaves are spatulate. the median ones are lanceolate, dentate, more or less amplexicaul. The flowering period extends from April to July.

Distribution and ecology
C. myconis occurs in the Mediterranean region of southern Europe. It has also been introduced in the south of Brazil, Argentina and Uruguay, where it is considered an invasive species.

References

External links

Anthemideae
Flora of Europe
Plants described in 1763